The North and Mid Wales Trunk Road Agent (NMWTRA) is one of the two trunk road agents in Wales. It is responsible for managing trunk roads in North and Mid Wales on behalf of the Welsh Government. A merger of two trunk road agencies, established separately on 1 April 2006, the North Wales Trunk Road Agency and Mid Wales Trunk Road Agency, the two bodies were merged and renamed to its current name on 1 April 2012. The agent manages trunk roads in eight principal areas of the north and mid regions of Wales: the respective principal councils of Anglesey, Ceredigion, Conwy, Denbighshire, Flintshire, Gwynedd (lead authority), Powys, and Wrexham. The remainder of Wales is managed by the South Wales Trunk Road Agent.

History

Prior to the North Wales Trunk Road Agency and Mid Wales Trunk Road Agency being established, motorways and trunk roads in Wales were managed by the Ministry of Transport, later being taken on by the Welsh Office. The National Assembly for Wales took responsibility for devolved powers on 1 July 1999, as part of this process, transport was transferred from the Parliament of the United Kingdom to the National Assembly for Wales and with it responsibility for the trunk road network, including motorways. Responsibility for the management of highways in Wales is split between the Welsh Government and local highway agencies. The Welsh Government is responsible for trunk roads and motorways, whilst the 22 local authorities are responsible for all other highways.

In 2001 the Welsh Government reviewed the way in which trunk roads and motorways were being managed, and by September 2004, they had decided to reduce the number of trunk road agencies from eight down to three. The three new agencies including the South Wales Trunk Road Agency (SWTRA), North Wales Trunk Road Agency (NWTRA) and Mid Wales Trunk Road Agency (MWTRA). Both the North Wales Trunk Road Agency and Mid Wales Trunk Road Agency was established on 1 April 2006, and by 1 April 2012 the two bodies merged and were renamed to become the North and Mid Wales Trunk Road Agent. The North and Mid Wales Trunk Road Agent is responsible for the trunk roads in 8 Local Authorities, on behalf of Isle of Anglesey County Council, Ceredigion County Council, Conwy County Borough Council, Denbighshire County Council, Flintshire County Council, Gwynedd Council, Powys County Council, and Wrexham County Borough Council. Gwynedd Council acts as the Lead Authority for NMWTRA is managed through the Trunk Road Management Unit (TRMU) who manage and maintains the trunk road network on behalf of the Welsh Government.

Roads managed

See also
Trunk roads in Wales
Highways in England and Wales
Trunk road
Trunk road agent
South Wales Trunk Road Agent
Roads in the United Kingdom
Welsh Government Traffic Officer

References

External links
Official website

Road transport in Wales
Welsh executive agencies